Harlem Park is a neighborhood in west Baltimore, Maryland.

References

Neighborhoods in Baltimore
West Baltimore